Dubli is a Bhil language of Gujarat and neighboring states. Half of ethnic Dubla speak Gujarati instead of their own ancestral tongue.

References

Hindi languages
Bhil